Michael Haydn's Symphony No. 2 in C major, Perger 2, Sherman 2, MH 37, was written in Oradea in 1761.

Scored for 2 oboes, 2 bassoons, 2 horns, 2 trumpets and strings and continuo, in four movements:

Allegro
Andante, in F major
Menuetto e Trio
Presto

The first movement begins almost like a concerto grosso, but is in fact in a proto-sonata form (with the very brief development carried almost entirely by the violins without accompaniment). The exposition has a repeat, and the development and recapitulation are also marked off by a repeat (which is not always observed).

The slow movement is written for strings only, but the continuo is generally understood to continue through; the violas rather than the second violins double the first violins at the octave (Delarte, 2006).

The Minuet has no pick-up, the horns and trumpets come to the foreground in the Trio. For the most part, the winds support the strings harmonically.

The last movement is a lively rondo with a stronger tendency to F major than to G major.

Discography

This work is included in a set of 20 symphonies on the CPO label with Bohdan Warchal conducting the Slovak Philharmonic, on disc 1. The recording has a figured bass realization, and both repeats in the first movement are taken. In Pál Németh's Hungaroton CD with the Savaria Baroque Orchestra the figured bass is also realized but the first movement repeats are ignored.

References

 Charles H. Sherman and T. Donley Thomas, Johann Michael Haydn (1737 - 1806), a chronological thematic catalogue of his works. Stuyvesant, New York: Pendragon Press (1993)
 C. Sherman, "Johann Michael Haydn" in The Symphony: Salzburg, Part 2 London: Garland Publishing (1982): lxiii

External links
 The Classical Archives has the entire work in four MIDI format files at the H page. All the files, including the file for the slow movement, have a simple figured bass realization that for the most part sticks to the harmony. Both repeats in the first movement are taken. The "Presto" indication for the Finale is interpreted to be much faster than on the Warchal recording.

Symphony 02
Compositions in C major
1761 compositions